The Tata Duende or El Dueño del Monte is a supernatural creature appearing in cultural folklore stories, mostly evident in Mayan and Mestizo cultures. The Tata Duende is considered a powerful spirit that protects animals and the jungle. There are many stories that have been passed on from generation to generation, to warn against this mischievous spirit. This creature has appeared on a postage stamp of Belize as part of a series on Belizean folklore. The name Tata Duende comes from the Yucatec Maya word "Tata" meaning Grandfather or old and the word "Duende" is Spanish for goblin. The Spanish term duende originated as a contraction of the phrase dueño de casa or duen de casa, "possessor of a house", and was originally conceptualized as a mischievous spirit inhabiting a house. In Yucatec Maya the Tata Duende is known as Nukuch Tat.

Origin 
The Tata Duende is a famous folklore common to the Maya culture and the Mestizo culture. According to different stories, The Tata Duende " is well known for luring children into the jungle, therefore, the Tata Duende has been used to scare children into behaving. Farmers would blame the Tata Duende if weird things happened on the farm. For example: it was common to see a horse's mane braided and it is claimed that these braids would be difficult to loose, sometimes it had to be cut. The true origin of the 'Tata Duende' seems to be quite unclear since many countries may have similar descriptions but different names. However, the term 'Tata Duende' seems to be coined in the Belizean folklore. Between the Yucatec Maya of Belize the Tata duende is known as Nukuch Tat or Tata Balam, it is seen as a good Maya guardian spirit of the forest, animals and humans. The Yucatec Maya of Belize continue giving offerings to the Tata duende for protection and for their help .

Description 
People who claimed to have seen the 'Tata Duende' said he was about 3 feet tall and wore a wide brimmed hat. Sometimes he wore a red hat and animal skin for clothing. He is also described as having his feet pointing backwards and his thumbs missing. Parents would tell their children that if they ever came across this creature to hide their thumbs or the Duende would bite it off. Some stories of people who have encountered the 'Tata Duende' say that they could recognize him because of his distinct whistle. Others say that he smokes cigars and plays the guitar. 

The creature was investigated on a 5th season episode of Destination Truth, where it was speculated that Tata Duende sightings might actually be of the indigenous spider monkey.

Stories 
There are many stories warning people to be cautious at farms or jungles when walking alone. The Duende has a special interest in children where he would lure them deeper into the woods and the only way to escape him would be if you hide your thumbs and show only your four fingers. The Duende would think you are like him and would let you go. Other stories say that the Duende would appear mostly during the 'Lenten Season' especially on 'Good Friday.' He is also known for braiding horses' manes and little girls' hair. In addition, the 'Tata Duende' is known to often change into a small animal, or even someone you know. Between the Yucatec Maya, the Tata Duende(Nukuch Tat) protects children in the bush. Many Yucatec Maya asks permission from the Nukuch Tat before entering the Bush or before entering to hunt.

See also
 Curupira

References

 Emmons, Katherine M. October 1997. Perceptions of the Environment while Exploring the Outdoors: a case study in Belize. Environmental Education Research. Ambingdon, Oxfordshire. Carfax Publishing, in conjunction with the University of Bath.
 The Belize Postal Service (1991). Folklore of Belize: Tata Duende

External links
"El Duende"- San Pedro Folklore

Central American mythology
Belizean culture
Goblins
Supernatural legends
Belizean folklore
Spanish-language Mesoamerican legendary creatures
Maya legendary creatures